The Yalu River Broken Bridge is a truncated railway swing bridge converted to a viewing platform and historical site. Constructed in 1911 by the Empire of Japan, it was the first bridge built across the Yalu River and connected the Chinese city of Dandong with the Korean city of Sinuiju, linking Japanese-ruled Korea to the Eurasian rail network. The bridge originally consisted of twelve truss spans supported by stone foundations in the riverbed. During the Korean War, the eight spans over the Korean side of the river were badly damaged by American bombing, and were subsequently dismantled. The bridge was not rebuilt. Instead, the remaining four spans over the Chinese side of the river were converted to a walkway, a viewing platform, and a historical site.

Location and dimension 
The railway bridge is located in Dandong, Liaoning, China, across the Yalu River from Sinuiji, North Korea. Its fourth span was a swing bridge that could be rotated to allow the passing of tall ships.

History 

The bridge was built by the Empire of Japan in 1911, to connect Japanese-ruled Korea with the Eurasian rail network. With its completion, the southern Korean port of Busan became connected by rail all the way to Calais, France. The Japanese began building the bridge in 1909, before the Qing dynasty government of China granted permission for its construction. By April 1910, with the Korean side of the bridge already half completed, Japan applied heavy pressure on the weak Qing government, then in its last throes, to authorize construction on the Chinese side. It was opened in October 1911, the first bridge across the Yalu River.

During the Korean War, the United States Air Force repeatedly bombed the Yalu River bridges to disrupt the transportation of Chinese troops and supplies into North Korea. On 8 November 1950, the US dispatched more than 100 B-29s to bomb the bridges, and six days later, another 34 bombers attacked and destroyed three spans of the older bridge. The aerial attacks were suspended on 5 December because the Yalu was frozen over and the Chinese could easily cross the river at many points. In February 1951, the US resumed bombing and damaged the bridge except four spans on the Chinese side. From then on it became known as the Broken Bridge.

Heritage and tourism 

After the end of the Korean War, North Korea dismantled its side of the severely damaged bridge. Four spans on the Chinese side, pockmarked by shrapnel, were left in place and preserved. In 1988, the City of Dandong declared Broken Bridge a municipal heritage site.

In 1993, the local government invested 3 million yuan to refurbish the bridge and opened it as a tourist attraction. Visitors can walk on the bridge to the middle of the Yalu River. The end of the Broken Bridge has become a viewing platform for visitors to get a closer look at North Korea.

The Broken Bridge is now a Major National Historical and Cultural Site of China.

See also
 New Yalu River Bridge, a new Chinese-built crossing that has been left incomplete because North Korea has not built any roads connecting to its end of the bridge.
 List of bridges in China

References

External links

Bridges to nowhere
Bridges in North Korea
Bridges in Liaoning
Buildings and structures in Dandong
Yalu River
1911 establishments in China
1911 establishments in Korea
1951 disestablishments in China
Korean War memorials and cemeteries
Major National Historical and Cultural Sites in Liaoning
Bridges completed in 1911
Korea under Japanese rule
Qing dynasty architecture
Swing bridges in China